Ivan Gel ( July 17, 1937, Klitsko (today Lviv Raion) – March 16, 2011) was a Ukrainian politician and dissident. He was a member of the Ukrainian Helsinki Group and the Ukrainian Christian Democratic Party.

References

1937 births
2011 deaths
Burials at Lychakiv Cemetery
People from Lviv Oblast
People from Lwów Voivodeship
Soviet dissidents
Ukrainian dissidents
Ukrainian politicians
Ukrainian Helsinki Group
Recipients of the Order of Prince Yaroslav the Wise, 4th class
Dubravlag detainees